Hagaribommanahalli  is a town and a taluk of Vijayanagara district in Karnataka state of India.

Demographics
 India census, Hagari Bommanahalli had a population of 24000.

Food
Jowar Rotti is the staple food here, along with Yennegai Palya (Brinjal/ Eggplant Curry). and Peanut powder.

Transport

Road
1.Bangalore-Chitradurga-Davanagere-Harihara-Harpanahalli- 80km Hagaribommanahalli.

2.Bangalore-Chitradurga-Jagalur-Kotturu-Hagaribommanahalli.

3.Bangalore-Chitradurga-Kudligi-Hagaribommanahalli.
   
3.Bellary-Hospet-Hagaribommanahalli.

4.Vijaywada-Hospet-Hagaribommanahalli.

5.Hyderabad-Hospet-Hagaribommanahalli.

6.Mumbai-Dharwad-Hubli-Hospet-Hagaribommanahalli.

Railways
Hagaribommanahalli was one of the railway stations on the Hospete-Kotturu railway meter gauge line. In 1995 this line was closed for gauge conversion and also for extending the railway line from Kotturu to Harihar on Hubballi-Bangalore Railway line. After numerous delays this railway line was opened and Hagaribommanahalli will get connectivity to Bellary, Hyderabad and also to Bangalore.

See also
 Bellary
 Districts of Karnataka

References

External links
 http://Vijayanagara.nic.in/

Cities and towns in Vijayanagara district